Kim Won-hae (born April 6, 1969) is a South Korean actor. He is best known as a former cast member of SNL Korea (season 1–4).

Personal life
In August 2020, it was reported that Kim tested positive for COVID-19 and was receiving treatment. He had recovered since September 2020.

Filmography

Film

Television series

Variety show

Theater

Awards and nominations

References

External links

 at SSGG Company 
 
 

South Korean male film actors
South Korean male television actors
South Korean male stage actors
1969 births
Living people
Seoul Institute of the Arts alumni
20th-century South Korean male actors
21st-century South Korean male actors
South Korean television personalities